The Wasp Woman (also known as The Bee Girl and Insect Woman) is a 1959 American independent science-fiction horror film produced and directed by Roger Corman. Filmed in black-and-white, it stars Susan Cabot, Anthony Eisley, Michael Mark, and Barboura Morris. The film was originally released by Filmgroup as a double feature with Beast from Haunted Cave. To pad out the film's running time when it was released to television two years later, a new prologue was added by director Jack Hill.

Plot
In the prologue, scientist Dr. Eric Zinthrop (Michael Mark) is fired from his job at a honey farm for experimenting with wasps.

The founder and owner of a large cosmetics company, Janice Starlin (Susan Cabot), is disturbed when her firm's sales begin to drop after it becomes apparent to her customer base that she is aging. Zinthrop has been able to extract enzymes from the royal jelly of the queen wasp that can reverse the aging process. Janice agrees to fund further research, at great cost, provided she can serve as his human subject. Displeased with the slowness of the results, she breaks into the scientist's laboratory after hours and injects herself with extra doses of the formula. Zinthrop becomes aware that some of the test creatures are becoming violent and goes to warn Janice, but before he can reach anyone, he gets into a car accident. He is thus temporarily missing and Janice goes through great trouble to find him, eventually taking over his care.

Janice continues her clandestine use of the serum and sheds 20 years in a single weekend, but soon discovers that she is periodically transformed into a murderous, wasp-like creature. Eventually, Zinthrop throws a jar of carbolic acid at her face, and another character, using a chair, pushes her out of a high window, and falls to her death.

Cast

Production

 
The film was originally known as Insect Woman.

The film was made for an estimate budget of $50,000.

In 1962, director Hill added 11 minutes to the film for its eventual television syndication release.

Release
The film was the third released by Filmgroup. It was released as a double feature with Beast from Haunted Cave. The film's theatrical release poster shows a creature with the head of a woman and the body of a wasp, but the Wasp Woman depicted in the film is exactly the opposite of this.

According to Tim Dirks, The Wasp Woman was one of a wave of "cheap teen movies" released for the drive-in market. They consisted of "exploitative, cheap fare created especially for them [teens] in a newly-established teen/drive-in genre".

The film was re-released as part of the "100th Anniversary of Monster Movies" in March 2010.

Soundtrack
The Wasp Womans musical score, written by Fred Katz, was originally composed for the film A Bucket of Blood. According to Mark Thomas McGee, author of Roger Corman: The Best of the Cheap Acts, each time Katz was called upon to write music for Corman, he sold the same score as if it were new music. The score was used in a total of seven films, including The Little Shop of Horrors and Creature from the Haunted Sea.

Reception
On Rotten Tomatoes the film has a 45% rating based on 11 reviews, with an average rating of 4.7 out of 10.

Variety declared that the "film has interesting points and looks polished but it's pretty slow and not very frightening". Charles Stinson of the Los Angeles Times wrote: "Leo Gordon's script is smoothly urbane with nice surprising little touches of humor here and there. Slim, intense, brunette  Susan Cabot, who always impresses, does excellently nuanced work as the neurotic lady with the worries and the wasps". The Monthly Film Bulletin stated: "The earlier, more realistic scenes of this modest shocker, which is slow to get going, are pretty unlikely, while the later bouts of fantasy are ludicrous rather than terrifying. Routine stuff, in fact, for determined enthusiasts only". Film critic Leonard Maltin gave the film a mostly positive 2 1/2 out of 4 stars. TV Guide gave the film a negative review, awarding it a score of 1 out of 4, and calling the film "laughable". Allmovie gave a negative review, criticizing the film's "ludicrous" monster costume, special effects, and low budget.

Parodies
On April 6, 2008, Cinematic Titanic did a live riff on the film to a theater audience. It was released on DVD on August 7. In the Courage the Cowardly Dog episode "Night of the Weremole", Muriel can be seen watching The Wasp Woman, which she describes as "her favorite show".

Cinema Insomnia
In 2007, The Wasp Woman was shown on the horror hosted television series Cinema Insomnia. Apprehensive Films later released the Cinema Insomnia episode on DVD.

Remakes
Rejuvenatrix (also known as The Rejuvenator) was inspired by Corman's film, with some critics calling it "a 1988 version of The Wasp Woman".

In 1995, a remake of The Wasp Woman was produced for the Roger Corman Presents series. The remake was directed by Jim Wynorski, and starred Jennifer Rubin as Janice Starlin.

See also
 The Fly (1958 film)
 The Wolf Man (1941 film)
 List of American films of 1959
 List of films in the public domain in the United States

References

Bibliography
 Warren, Bill. Keep Watching The Skies, Vol II: 1958–1962. Jefferson, North Carolina: McFarland & Company, 1986. .

External links

 
 
 
 
 

1959 films
1950s science fiction horror films
1950s teen films
American science fiction horror films
American black-and-white films
1950s English-language films
Films about businesspeople
Films about shapeshifting
Films directed by Roger Corman
Mad scientist films
Fictional Hymenoptera
1950s monster movies
Films produced by Roger Corman
American monster movies
American body horror films
1950s American films